is a Japanese photographer of the Kii Peninsula, Osaka, and other subjects.

Life and career
Dodo was born in Osaka in 1947. He graduated in fine arts from Kyushu Sangyo University in 1970, and started teaching at  Tōkyō Shashin Senmon Gakkō (now Visual Arts College Tokyo). Two years later he started work as a teacher of photography at Ōsaka Shashin Senmon Gakkō; in 1998 he was made head of the school, by that time renamed Visual Arts College Osaka.

Dodo was present when the film director Naomi Kawase, who had first been a student of his and was later teaching at Visual Arts Senmon Gakkō, had her first baby on 24 April 2004, in Nara. This was filmed as Tarachime and Dodo photographed the event; the photographs were exhibited in Nara, Tokyo, and Locarno, and published as Haha.

Dodo's book of large-format black-and-white photographs A Radiant Land: Kii Peninsula won the PSJ's Annual Award for 1995; his later collection of large-format colour photographs of the peninsula, A Radiant Land with Thousands of Years, was exhibited in Nara City Museum of Photography in 2000. The latter work also won him the Ina Nobuo Award in 1999.

Dodo has said that his major influences were Shōmei Tōmatsu, especially his Ryūkyū series "Pencil of the Sun", and Yutaka Takanashi, for the way in which Takanashi's concentration on Tokyo showed Dodo his own possibilities in Osaka. Among the photographers he admires are Robert Frank and William Klein.

Awards
Ina Nobuo Award, 1999.
Hidano Kazuemon Award (Higashikawa Awards), 2011.

Exhibitions by Dodo

1978 "Ōsaka, Tennōji". Nikon Salon (Ginza, Osaka).
1985 "Shinsekai: Mukashi mo ima mo". Nikon Salon (Ginza, Osaka).
1992 "Shujō yūraku, Bankoku". Nikon Salon (Ginza, Osaka).
1995–96 "Rakudo Kii hantō". Konica Plaza (Shinjuku, Osaka, Sapporo).
1999 "Sennen rakudo". Nikon Salon (Ginza, Osaka).
2000 "Sennen rakudo Kii hantō". Nara City Museum of Photography.
2002 ".com New York". Nikon Salon (Shinjuku).
2004 "Sharasōju". Visual Arts Gallery.
2006 "Haha". Gallery Out of Place (Nara).
2007 "Ha ha". Galerie Focale (Nyon).
2007 "Haha + vegetable". Gallery Bauhaus (Tokyo).
2007 "Ha ha". Focale Galerie (Locarno).
2010 "Osaka". Nikon Salon (Ginza and Osaka).
2010 "Kamagasaki/Shinsekai: Life in the shadow of the economic miracle". Zen Foto  Gallery (Shibuya, Tokyo). Photographs of Shinsekai and Kamagasaki (both in Osaka) by Dodo and Seiryū Inoue.
2010 "Osaka". Tokio  Out of Place (Minami Azabu, Tokyo).

Film, video
Coproducer, The Mourning Forest (2007).
Actor, Tsunagari-yuku mono / Things Passed Down (dir. Naomi Kawase, 2009). Dodo plays the gruff photographer father in this long commercial for Nikon.

Publications by Dodo

 Chihei / Horizon. Issues 1–10. 1971–77.
 Shinsekai: Mukashi mo ima mo. Osaka: Chōseisha, 1986. Black-and-white photographs of Shinsekai, Osaka. 
 Horizon, 1993. A joint work.
 Shashin "Ningen no machi" 93/94 /  Faces of Humanity 93/94. Edited by Shunji Dodo, George Hashiguchi, and Naomi Yanagimoto. Published by the editors (at their respective addresses), 1994.  Much of the text is in English as well as Japanese. On pp. 156–65 Dodo presents his own series, "Kaosu 1969–1970", photographs of people from US military bases and of protests against these.
 Rakudo: Kii hantō / A Radiant Land: Kii Peninsula. Osaka: Brain Center, 1995. . Large-format black-and-white photographs of the Kii Peninsula. 
 Sennen rakudo / A Radiant Land with Thousands of Years. Osaka: Brain Center, 2000. . Large-format colour photographs of the Kii Peninsula. 
 Sharasōju / Shara. Nara: Sento/Kumie, 2003.  With Naomi Kawase; black-and-white photographs of the making of, and production notes for, Kawase's film Shara. 
 Haha. Nara: Gallery Out of Place, 2006.
 Saien + sakura / A Vegetable Garden, Sakura. Osaka: Vacuum Press, 2009. . Black-and-white photographs of the products of Dodo's vegetable garden, and of cherry blossoms. 
 Ōsaka ( / Osaka. Kyoto: Seigensha, 2010. . Large-format black-and-white photographs of Osaka. 
 Haruka na chihei ( / Horizon far and away 1968–1977. Tokyo: Akaakasha, 2012. . Numerous series of Dodo's older photographs. 
 Nihonkai ( / Japan Sea. Tokyo: Akaakasha, 2014. . Photographs of the Sea of Japan coastal area. 
 Sorahoderi no machi ( / A City Aglow. Tokyo: Case, 2019. .

Notes

External links
First of a series of five photographs from Haha.
Publisher's page for Osaka, with sample photographs.
Publisher's page for Saien + sakura, with (tiny) sample photographs.
Transcript of a short MBS program about Dodo, broadcast on 21 May 2010. 

Japanese photographers
Japanese academics
People from Osaka
Living people
1947 births